Songs with Legs is a live album by the American composer, bandleader and keyboardist Carla Bley with the saxophonist Andy Sheppard and the bass guitarist Steve Swallow recorded in Europe and released on the Watt/ECM label in 1994.

Reception
The AllMusic review by Alex Henderson awarded the album 2½ stars and said, "For those who've said they wish Bley would solo more often, Songs with Legs is an album to hear." A biographer also highlighted her increased focus on piano and improvisation at this period in Bley's career, and highlighted the "soulful, spiritual-like piece 'The Lord Is Listenin' to Ya, Hallelujah!'". The Penguin Guide to Jazz awarded it 3 stars, saying, "She doesn't put a foot wrong throughout."

Track listing
All compositions by Carla Bley except where noted.
 "Real Life Hits" - 8:08  
 "The Lord Is Listenin' to Ya, Hallelujah!" - 7:48  
 "Chicken" - 8:21  
 "Misterioso" (Thelonious Monk) - 10:20  
 "Wrong Key Donkey" - 12:02  
 "Crazy with You" - 7:37
Recorded live on tour in France, Italy, Austria, Germany, Turkey and England in May 1994.

Personnel
Carla Bley - piano
Andy Sheppard - tenor saxophone, soprano saxophone
Steve Swallow - bass guitar

References

ECM Records live albums
Carla Bley live albums
Steve Swallow live albums
Andy Sheppard albums
1994 live albums